Kudremani is a village in Belgaum district in Karnataka, India. surrounded by MaharashtraState by all side.

References

Villages in Belagavi district